Aliaksandr Kazubouski (born 20 December 1981) is a Belarusian rower. He competed at the 2008 Summer Olympics (placed 12th) and the 2012 Summer Olympics (placed 7th). Won the world title in 2012 World Rowing Championships in Plodviv, Bulgaria.  Won the European Title in 2010 European Rowing Championships in Montemor-o-Velho, Portugal.  In 2011 Kazubouski, as part of the team Dynamo Brest, competed in the Stewards' Challenge Cup at Henley Royal Regatta.

Events 
2019 World Indoor Rowing Championship - Long Beach, CA, USA (gold medal)
 2019 C.R.A.S.H. -B. Sprints – Boston, MA, USA (silver medal)
 2019 ERG Sprints – Alexandria, VA, USA (gold medal)

Records 
2019 Erg Sprints: set a record in 30 minute row among Masters (age 30–39)

Personal life 
Aliaksandr is married to Natallia Halapiatava, who is also a rower.

References

External links
 

1981 births
Living people
Belarusian male rowers
Olympic rowers of Belarus
Rowers at the 2008 Summer Olympics
Rowers at the 2012 Summer Olympics
Sportspeople from Brest, Belarus